KLOU (103.3 FM) is a radio station with a classic hits format in St. Louis, Missouri, specializing in hits from the 1980s and 1990s with some 1970s hits mixed in.  Its transmitter is located in Gravois, and operates from studios in St. Louis south of Forest Park.  It is owned by iHeartMedia (previously Clear Channel Communications until September 16, 2014).

KLOU also broadcasts in the HD Radio digital format.

History
The station began broadcasting on February 12, 1962 as KMOX-FM, by playing an easy listening/standards format. The focus then shifted to an adult contemporary style of music by the 1970s. In the summer of 1981, KMOX-FM began gradually evolving its format toward Top 40/CHR by adding more and more current hits to its rotation; by August 1982, the transition was complete, and the station's call letters were changed to KHTR on December 20, 1982. "Hitradio 103", like sister stations WHTT in Boston and KKHR in Los Angeles, was modeled after programmer Mike Joseph's successful Hot Hits format, although unlike early Hot Hits stations, KHTR also played recurrent hits and oldies. KHTR was an almost immediate success, quickly becoming the #2 station in the demographic group 12 years old and over in the market, behind only sister KMOX. (1) The "Hot Hits" format led to the station sometimes being referred derisively as "Keep Hearing Those Repeats", a play on the KHTR call letters.

The oldies arrived on November 5, 1988, when KHTR changed to its current call letters of KLOU, with the station playing hits from the 1950s, 1960s and early-mid-1970s. The first song played on “Oldies 103” was “Rock and Roll is Here to Stay” by Danny and the Juniors. The station was originally known as “Oldies 103” and eventually changing the branding name to “Oldies 103.3”. Gradually, the 1950s hits would disappear from the station's playlist, and more hits from the late 1970s and 1980s soon followed. The Oldies named was eventually dropped from the branding name and known as just 103.3 KLOU. KLOU was the official radio station for the NFL's St. Louis Rams from 2000 until it was replaced by all-sports newcomer WXOS in 2009. (This was shown in the station's logo from 2000–2007.)

The station was first owned by CBS Radio until the mid-1990s, when a merger with American Radio Systems brought CBS over the ownership limit in several markets, including St. Louis.  KLOU was purchased by Entercom in 1997, and then Clear Channel Communications (now, as previously stated, iHeartMedia) in 1999, and has been owned by the San Antonio-based company since then.

KLOU now airs American Top 40 1970s' and 1980s' rebroadcasts on the weekends; as KHTR, the station aired AT40 for most of the 1980s.

On June 18, 2007, KLOU dropped its "103.3 KLOU" branding and oldies format for a more classic hits approach as "My 103.3", launching with Bachman-Turner Overdrive's "Takin' Care of Business". They would later drop the "My" branding and return to using their call letters.

On April 29, 2010, the station rebranded as "Rewind 103.3."  On May 31, 2011, KLOU shifted their format to back to 1960s'-early 1980s' classic hits, and rebranded as "103.3 KLOU". During the mid to late 2010s, KLOU’s playlist would shift to a 1970s-1990s direction, with a core focus on music from the 1980s.

All Rams Radio on HD2
Unlike most of Clear Channel's FM radio stations, KLOU's HD2 feed originally did not carry a direct feed from the Format Lab. Instead, the station, until 2009, aired a format called All Rams Radio, a year-round tape loop of complete St. Louis Rams games from recent weeks. During the offseason, games from as far back as the 1990s often aired on the subchannel. Even though iHeartMedia owns several flagship stations of NFL teams, St. Louis was the only market in which Clear Channel used this concept.

As with all Clear Channel HD subchannels, All Rams Radio was available for free streaming on the Internet. While the NFL has been fairly strict regarding its prohibition of broadcasting live games, they made no comment about this arrangement. KLOU lost the rights to the Rams to Bonneville Broadcasting-owned WXOS in 2009, which brought an end to "All Rams Radio."  Bonneville has since sold WXOS to Twin Cities-based Hubbard Broadcasting. "All Rams Radio" was replaced with 1950s/1960s hits.

Previous logos

References

External links
KLOU official website

Radio stations established in 1962
Classic hits radio stations in the United States
LOU
1962 establishments in Missouri
IHeartMedia radio stations